Wellsville is a village in southern Columbiana County, Ohio, United States, along the Ohio River. Its population was 3,113 at the 2020 census. In its heyday, Wellsville was home to industries in transportation, both through rail terminals on the Pennsylvania Railroad and docks on the Ohio River, as well as pottery and ceramics manufacturing.

History

Early history and establishment
In 1770, George Washington with his friend and personal surveyor, William Crawford, embarked on a journey down the Ohio River from Pittsburgh for the purpose of viewing lands to be apportioned among soldiers who had served in the French and Indian War. They are reported to have surveyed the Wellsville area, just north of Yellow Creek in 1770, and it was noted in his journal that it was good bottom land.

The Yellow Creek Massacre occurred near Wellsville in 1774. A group of Virginian settlers killed the relatives of a prominent Iroquois leader, Logan, who was camped on Yellow Creek. Logan took revenge, resulting in Lord Dunmore's War.

James Clark and William Wells first settled in the area in 1795. Although they had to leave for a while due to Native American attacks in the area, they returned between 1797 and 1800. Wellsville was founded in 1797 by William Wells, a Pennsylvanian, and former justice of the Territory Northwest of the River Ohio. Wellsville's first school and church were also established before 1800. A barn built in 1807 by the Aten family was moved to Hale Farm and Village in Bath, Ohio.

19th century to present
In 1814, a turnpike road was built to Lisbon, and in 1816, a post office was established with John J. Feehan serving as postmaster.  In the 1820s, the first Methodist Episcopal Church was organized by Rev. John Callahan in the house of William Wells. This is supposed to be the first Methodist Episcopal Church organized in Ohio. Shortly thereafter, Joseph Wells founded the Methodist Protestant Church.

Wellsville finally took shape around 1823, when William Wells recorded that lots had been laid out for planned settlement. The initial site was bounded by the current Third and Fifth Streets, between Riverside Avenue and Commerce Street (although at the time they had different names.) In 1836, a foundry was opened to make steamboat machinery. It later became known as the Stevenson Company, and produced brick-making machinery. It still exists today as a fabrication and machine shop.

Wellsville was incorporated as a village in 1848. In 1852, the Cleveland & Pittsburgh Railroad (later acquired by the Pennsylvania Railroad) built a track from Hanover, Ohio, to Wellsville, and in 1856, it built a track from Wellsville to Rochester, Pennsylvania.

On February 14, 1861, Abraham Lincoln, on his way to his first inauguration, spoke to a large gathering in front of the Whitacre House, a hotel, in Wellsville. On July 26, 1863,  Confederate States Army General John Hunt Morgan and several hundred of his soldiers surrendered to pursuing Union forces after Morgan's Raid ended in nearby West Point, and were held in Wellsville before being shipped to the Ohio Penitentiary in Columbus. Morgan's Raid was the northernmost advance of Confederate troops during the Civil War. At this time, Ohio State Route 45 was known as the Warren-Ashtabula Turnpike, which ran from Wellsville to Lake Erie. It was an important part of the Underground Railroad.

During the 1896 presidential campaign, Democratic candidate William Jennings Bryan addressed a crowd in Wellsville from the back of a train.  Bryan was the first candidate to successfully embrace "whistle stop" campaigning, harnessing the power of a young rail network to reach masses of voters.

The 1936 flooding of the Ohio River resulted in the construction of a flood wall. In 1951, his only year of varsity basketball at Wellsville, Bevo Francis scored 776 points in 25 games for an average of nearly 32 points per game. In the process, he led his team to a stunning 19-1 regular-season record and a berth in the state playoffs.  He was a unanimous all-state performer. In 1986, the 1870 Episcopal Church of the Ascension and Manse was listed on the National Register of Historic Places.

Geography
Wellsville is located at  (40.604168, -80.652207).

The elevation is 682 feet above sea level.

It is located on the Allegheny Plateau. Its southern border is the Ohio River. On its eastern border is the Little Yellow Creek and on its western border is the Yellow Cheek. Its northern border is rising hills.

Demographics

2010 census
As of the census of 2010, there were 3,541 people, 1,475 households, and 957 families residing in the village. The racial makeup of the village was 89.3% White, 6.8% African American, 0.1% Native American, 0.4% Asian, 0.5% from other races, and 3.0% from two or more races. Hispanic or Latino of any race were 1.2% of the population.

There were 1,475 households, of which 34.6% had children under the age of 18 living with them, 36.0% were married couples living together, 22.5% had a female householder with no husband present, 6.4% had a male householder with no wife present, and 35.1% were non-families. 30.8% of all households were made up of individuals, and 12.6% had someone living alone who was 65 years of age or older. The average household size was 2.40 and the average family size was 2.96.

The median age in the village was 37.6 years. 26% of residents were under the age of 18; 8.3% were between the ages of 18 and 24; 24.3% were from 25 to 44; 26.5% were from 45 to 64; and 14.8% were 65 years of age or older. The gender makeup of the village was 46.9% male and 53.1% female.

2000 census
As of the census of 2000, there were 4,133 people, 1,696 households, and 1,107 families residing in the village. The population density was 2,348.4 people per square mile (906.7/km). There were 1,869 housing units at an average density of 1,062.0 per square mile (410.0/km). The racial makeup of the village was 90.59% White, 6.97% African American, 0.12% Native American, 0.12% Asian, 0.02% Pacific Islander, 0.05% from other races, and 2.13% from two or more races. Hispanic or Latino of any race were 0.39% of the population.

There were 1,696 households, out of which 31.4% had children under the age of 18 living with them, 42.0% were married couples living together, 19.0% had a female householder with no husband present, and 34.7% were non-families. 30.2% of all households were made up of individuals, and 15.6% had someone living alone who was 65 years of age or older. The average household size was 2.43 and the average family size was 3.02.

In the village, the population was spread out, with 26.3% under the age of 18, 9.5% from 18 to 24, 26.9% from 25 to 44, 21.4% from 45 to 64, and 16.0% who were 65 years of age or older. The median age was 37 years. For every 100 females, there were 86.9 males. For every 100 females age 18 and over, there were 80.8 males.

The median income for a household in the village was $26,198, and the median income for a family was $33,245. Males had a median income of $26,724 versus $19,904 for females. The per capita income for the village was $14,335. About 16.5% of families and 17.1% of the population were below the poverty line, including 23.3% of those under age 18 and 12.1% of those age 65 or over.

Government

Wellsville operates under a council–manager government, where there are six council members elected as a legislature in addition to the mayor, who serves as an executive. All are elected for 4-year terms. The council employs a village manager and fiscal officer for administration. The current mayor is Robert Boley (D), the current village administrator is Jarrod Grimm, and the current fiscal officer is Hoi Wah.

Education
Children in Wellsville are served by the Wellsville Local School District. The current schools serving the village are:

Garfield Elementary School – grades PK-3
Daw Elementary School – grades 4-7
Wellsville Junior/Senior High School – grades 8-12

Wellsville is also served by the Wellsville Carnegie Public Library. It was established on February 15, 1912. In 2005, the library loaned more than 55,000 items to its 8,000 cardholders. Total holdings as of 2005 are over 36,000 volumes with over 62 periodical subscriptions.

Notable people

 Mary Bowermaster, American record holder in World Masters Athletics Championships
 Tom Casey, Canadian Football League player, led league in rushing yards from 1950 to 1956
 Bevo Francis, NCAA basketball player who was one of the most prolific scorers in college basketball history during his career at Rio Grande College
 Wallace Samuel Gourley, Federal judge of the United States District Court for the Western District of Pennsylvania
 William Peters Hepburn, U.S. Representative from Iowa's 8th District
 Burr McIntosh, Lecturer, photographer, film studio owner, silent film actor, author, publisher of Burr McIntosh Monthly
 Melvin E. Newlin, United States Marine and Medal of Honor recipient
 Clete Patterson, NFL player
 Frank "Killjoy" Pucci, vocalist of the death metal band Necrophagia
 William Chapman Ralston, San Francisco businessman and financier, founder of the Bank of California
 James William Reilly, Ohio state representative, general in Union Army during American Civil War
 P. Craig Russell, comic book illustrator

References

Further reading
 History of Wellsville, OH by Frank L. Wells From: History of Columbiana County, Ohio by Harold B. Barth The Historical Publishing Company Topeka-Indianapolis, 1926
 Before The Memory Fades 1795 - 1950 by Edgar Stanton Davidson Hardcover, 72 pages Publisher: The Wellsville Historical Society:1003 Riverside Avenue, Wellsville, OH(330) 532-1018

External links
 Wellsville Historical Society

Villages in Columbiana County, Ohio
Villages in Ohio
Ohio populated places on the Ohio River
Populated places established in 1797
1797 establishments in the Northwest Territory